Keith McErlean (born ) is an Irish actor from Carndonagh in Inishowen, County Donegal, in Ireland. His career began when he graduated from the Gaiety School of Acting in 1998. McErlean has appeared in a number of plays for the Abbey Theatre and Peacock Theatre, including Making History, Lovers at Versailles and Tartuffe.

He is known for his role as Barry in all three series (2001 to 2006) of Bachelors Walk for RTÉ. In 2004, he played Declan Breen in the film The Blackwater Lightship, adapted for CBS from Colm Tóibín's original novel. In 2006, he played Vernon Todmann in the movie Flyboys. From 2008 until 2013, he appeared in the RTÉ series Raw playing the character of Shane Harte, in which he was nominated for outstanding actor in a TV drama at the 49th Monte-Carlo Television Festival. He played Adam Lynch in the TV series "Trivia", and received a nomination for a Golden Nymph at the 51st Monte Carlo Television Festival, this time for Outstanding Actor in a Comedy Series.

References

External links
 

Year of birth missing (living people)
Living people
Irish male film actors
Irish male stage actors
Irish male television actors
Male actors from County Donegal